The 1971–72 1re série season was the 51st season of the 1re série, the top level of ice hockey in France. 11 teams participated in the league, and Chamonix Hockey Club won their 27th league title.

First round

Paris-Nord Group
 
(Athletic Club de Boulogne Billancourt forfeited the entire season after only one game, an 8-3 win over CG Poitiers.)

Alpes-Provence Group

Qualification game for final round
 Gap Hockey Club - Français Volants 6:3

Second round

Final round

5th-8th place

External links
Season on hockeyarchives.info

France
1971–72 in French ice hockey
Ligue Magnus seasons